Patrick Boutot (born 14 November 1953 in Brive-la-Gaillarde, Corrèze), better known as Patrick Sébastien, is a French television host, producer and  media personality, radio host, singer, writer, producer, director, impressionist entertainer, comedian, TV and film actor, and former president of the French rugby team CA Brive.

Discography

Albums

Compilation albums

Singles

Filmography
Director
2000: T'aime 
2009: La Cellule de Zarkane
Actor
1984: Le Pactole as Rousselet
1985: Le téléphone sonne toujours deux fois!! as L'aveugle
1997: Quatre garçons pleins d'avenir as Georges
2000: T'aime as Dr Hugues Michel

Radio and television

1984-1987: Carnaval (TF1)
1991-1992: Surprise sur prise - co-presented with Marcel Béliveau (TF1)
1992: Le Grand Bluff (TF1)
1998-2019: Le Plus Grand Cabaret du Monde'' (France 2)

References

1953 births
Living people
French television presenters
French radio presenters
French male film actors
French film directors
French humorists
French comedians
French rugby union chairmen and investors
People from Brive-la-Gaillarde
French male television actors
French male writers
French impressionists (entertainers)